The men's 100 metres at the 1966 European Athletics Championships was held in Budapest, Hungary, at Népstadion on 30 and 31 August 1966.

Medalists

Results

Final
31 August
Wind: -0.6 m/s

Semi-finals
31 August

Semi-final 1
Wind: 0.6 m/s

Semi-final 2
Wind: -1.3 m/s

Semi-final 3
Wind: -0.6 m/s

Heats
30 August

Heat 1
Wind: -1.3 m/s

Heat 2
Wind: -0.1 m/s

Heat 3
Wind: 0 m/s

Heat 4
Wind: 0 m/s

Heat 5
Wind: -0.1 m/s

Heat 6
Wind: 0 m/s

Participation
According to an unofficial count, 36 athletes from 18 countries participated in the event.

 (1)
 (1)
 (3)
 (2)
 (3)
 (1)
 (1)
 (3)
 (3)
 (1)
 (3)
 (1)
 (3)
 (1)
 (2)
 (1)
 (3)
 (3)

References

100 metres
100 metres at the European Athletics Championships